Koki (Konke, Kokak), or Koki Naga, is an unclassified Sino-Tibetan language spoken in Burma. Speakers are included under the wider Naga ethnicity. It has been documented in Shintani (2018).

Classification
Koki is currently unclassified within Tibeto-Burman. Ethnologue (21st edition) notes that Koki shares 19%–32% lexical similarity with Tangkhul Naga [ntx] in Myanmar, 23% with Akyaung Ari Naga [nqy], and 22%–24% with Jejara Naga [pzn].

Distribution
It is spoken in 10 villages of southern Leshi Township, Hkamti District, Sagaing Region, Myanmar.

References

Sources 
Barkman, Tiffany. 2014. A descriptive grammar of Jejara (Para Naga). MA thesis, Chiang Mai: Payap University.

Languages of Myanmar
Kuki-Chin–Naga languages
Unclassified Sino-Tibetan languages